The 2014–15 BIC Basket (37th edition), Angola's top tier basketball club competition, ran from November 20, 2014 through June 16, 2015. It consisted of four stages plus the playoffs. At the initial stage (regular season) all ten teams played each other in a double round robin system. In stage 2 (group stage 1), the first six teams from the regular season played in a single round robin in each group. In stage 3 (group stage 2), the first five teams from group stage 1 played in a round robin in group A whereas the four teams in group B plus the relegated team from group A played round robin classification matches in group B. In stage 4 (semifinals), the first-seeded team played a best-of-five series with the fourth-seeded team whereas the 2nd-seeded team played the third-seeded team with the winners playing a best-of-seven series of matches for the title and the losers playing a best-of-three series for third place. The 5th-seeded team from group A joined group B to play the group's 3rd-seeded team also in a best-of-five series whereas 1st-seeded plays 2nd seeded. Winners of those group B matches played a best-of-seven series for seventh place, the losers played a best-of-three for ninth place whereas the last two teams in group B will be relegated to the 2nd division championship.

BIC Basket Participants (2014–15 Season)

Regular Season (November 20, 2014 - March 13, 2015)

 Note: Numbers in brackets indicate round number

Regular season standings

Regular Season Awards 
2015 BIC Basket MVP
  Leonel Paulo (Petro de Luanda)

2015 BIC Basket Top Scorer
  Leonel Paulo (Petro de Luanda)

2015 BIC Basket Top Rebounder
  Jason Cain (Petro de Luanda)

2015 BIC Basket Top Assistor
  Manny Quezada (Petro de Luanda)

Group Stage 1 (March 20 - April 13, 2015)

Group A

Group B

 Note: Numbers in (brackets) indicate round number

 Awarded a bonus point for finishing first in regular season** Relegated to group B

Group Stage 2 (April 24 - May 10, 2015)

Group A

Group B

 Relegated to group B

Semifinals (May 19–28, 2015)

Petro Atlético vs ASA

1º de Agosto vs Rec do Libolo

Finals (June 2–16, 2015)

Petro Atlético vs Rec Libolo

Finals Awards
2015 BIC Basket Finals MVP
  Manny Quezada (Petro de Luanda)

2015 BIC Basket Finals Top Scorer
  Manny Quezada (Petro de Luanda)

2015 BIC Basket Finals Top Rebounder
  Jason Cain (Petro de Luanda)

2015 BIC Basket Finals Top Assistor
  Manny Quezada (Petro de Luanda)

See also
BIC Basket
2014 2nd Division Basketball
BAI Basket Past Seasons
Federação Angolana de Basquetebol

External links
Angolan Basketball Federation at Fiba Live Stats
Official Website 
Africabasket.com League Page at Africabasket

References

Angolan Basketball League seasons
League
Angola